Ratua is a village in the Ratua I CD block in the Chanchal subdivision of Malda district in the state of West Bengal, India.

Geography

Location

Area overview
The area shown in the adjacent map covers two physiographic regions – the Barind in the east and the tal in the west. The eastern part is comparatively high (up to 40 metres above mean sea level at places) and uneven. The soils of the eastern region are “hard salty clays of a reddish hue and the ground is baked hard as iron.” It lies to the east of the Mahananda River. The area lying to the west of the Mahananda River, the tal, is a flat low land and “is strewn with innumerable marshes, bils and oxbow lakes.” The tal area is prone to flooding by local rivers. The total area is overwhelmingly rural. There are two important historical/ archaeological sites in the area – Pandua and Jagjivanpur.

Note: The map alongside presents some of the notable locations in the area. All places marked in the map are linked in the larger full screen map.

Civic administration

Police station
Ratua police station under West Bengal police has jurisdiction over Ratua I CD block.

CD block HQ
The headquarters of Ratua I CD block is at Ratua.

Demographics
According to the 2011 Census of India, Ratua had a total population of 5,498, of which 2,850 (52%) were males and 2,648 (48%) were females. Population in the age range 0–6 years was 800. The total number of literate persons in Ratua was 3,053 (64.99% of the population over 6 years).

Transport
Ratua is on National Highway 131A/ State Highway 10 (partly common route).

Healthcare
Ratua Rural Hospital at Ratua (with 30 beds) is the main medical facility in Ratua I CD block. There are primary health centres at Debipur (with 10 beds), Mahanandatola (with 10 beds) and Samsi (with 10 beds).

References

Villages in Malda district